Yun Ziqiang (April 28, 1899 – February 22, 1963) was a Chinese chemist, who was a member of the Chinese Academy of Sciences.

References 

1899 births
1963 deaths
Members of the Chinese Academy of Sciences